Betty Jo Geiger (née Springs; born June 12, 1961) is an American former long-distance runner who competed in events ranging from 3000-meter run to the marathon.

Her greatest individual success was at the inaugural IAAF World Women's Road Race Championships in 1983, where she was runner-up to Britain's Wendy Sly and led the Americans to the team gold medal. Geiger was a key member of the national team at the IAAF World Cross Country Championships in the 1980s. Her first team medal – a silver – came at the 1981 championships and following that she helped the United States to three consecutive team titles in 1983, 1984 and 1985. She finished in the top ten on each occasion, being the number one American in 1983 and number two American athlete to Jan Merrill, Joan Benoit and Cathy Branta in the other years. She made one more appearance at the competition in 1986, and also represented her country at the Goodwill Games that year.

She was a four-time national champion, having won the 5000-meter run at the 1986 USA Outdoor Track and Field Championships (in a championship record time), the national 10K run three times (1984, 1985, and 1986) and the individual title at the USA Cross Country Championships. She attended North Carolina State University and won four NCAA Championships for the NC State Wolfpack team: a 5000/10,000 m double at the 1983 NCAA Women's Division I Outdoor Track and Field Championships and victories at the NCAA Women's Division I Cross Country Championship in 1981 and 1983. She won the Broderick Award (now the Honda Sports Award) as the nation's best female collegiate cross country runner in 1984. She was inducted into the NC State Hall of Fame in 2013.

Geiger competed extensively at professional road races and had wins at the Peachtree Road Race, Freihofer's Run for Women (three times), and Gate River Run, as well as runner-up finishes at the Falmouth Road Race and Gasparilla Distance Classic. She married her former college coach Rollie Geiger. In her youth she won the national junior title over 3000 m and was undefeated in Florida high school competitions, with 15 state titles for Bayshore High School in her native Bradenton.

International competitions

National titles
USA Outdoor Track and Field Championships
5000 m: 1986
USA Road Running Championships
10K run: 1984, 1985, 1986
USA Cross Country Championships
Long course: 1983
NCAA Women's Division I Outdoor Track and Field Championships
5000 m: 1983
10,000 m: 1983
NCAA Women's Division I Cross Country Championship
Individual: 1981, 1983
USA Junior Outdoor Track and Field Championships
3000 m: 1979

Circuit wins
Cinque Mulini: 1985
Bislett Games
5000 m: 1983
Penn Relays
3000 m: 1981
5000 m: 1983
Bonne Bell Mini Marathon: 1984
Peachtree Road Race: 1984
Freihofer's Run for Women: 1984, 1985, 1986
Gate River Run: 1985
Pittsburgh Great Race: 1988
Capital City Marathon: 1983

Personal bests

3000-meter run – 8:59.79 min (1983)
5000-meter run – 15:25.24 min (1985)
10,000-meter run – 32:33.04 min (1988)
10K run – 32:13 min (1986)
15K run – 49:25 min (1985)
10-mile run – 54:45 min (1988)
Marathon – 2:37:14 hours (1983)

See also
List of 5000 metres national champions (women)

References

External links

Living people
1961 births
Sportspeople from Bradenton, Florida
Track and field athletes from Florida
American female long-distance runners
American female marathon runners
American female cross country runners
NC State Wolfpack women's track and field athletes
NC State Wolfpack women's cross country runners
Competitors at the 1986 Goodwill Games
20th-century American women